Rafael Jeroným Kubelík, KBE (29 June 1914 – 11 August 1996) was a Czech conductor and composer.

The son of a distinguished violinist, Jan Kubelík, he was trained in Prague and made his debut with the Czech Philharmonic Orchestra at the age of 19. Having managed to maintain a career in Czechoslovakia under the Nazi occupation, he refused to work under what he considered a "second tyranny" after the Communist Czechoslovak coup d'état of 1948, and took refuge in Britain. He became a Swiss citizen in 1967.

Kubelík was music director of  the Chicago Symphony Orchestra (1950–53), musical director of The Royal Opera, Covent Garden (1955–58). In 1957, he conducted and recorded the World premiere Berlioz's Les Troyens. During (1961- 79), he was music director of the Bavarian Radio Symphony Orchestra (1961–79), and was a frequent guest conductor for leading orchestras in Europe and America.

As a composer, Kubelík wrote in a neo-romantic idiom. His works include five operas, three symphonies, chamber music, choral works, and songs.

Life and career

Early life
Kubelík was born in Býchory, Bohemia, Austria-Hungary, today's Czech Republic, the day after Archduke Ferdinand's assassination that triggered the First World War. He was the sixth child of the Bohemian violinist Jan Kubelík, whom the younger Kubelík described as "a kind of god to me". His mother was a Hungarian countess, Anna Julie Marie Széll von Bessenyö.  Kubelík studied the violin with his father, and entered the Prague Conservatory at the age of 14,  studying violin, piano, composition, and conducting. He graduated from the conservatory in 1933, at the age of 19; at his graduation concert he played a Paganini concerto and a composition of his own for violin and orchestra. Kubelík was also an accomplished pianist, and served as his father's accompanist on a tour of the United States in 1935.

Brno
In 1939, Kubelík became music director of the Brno Opera, a position he held until the Nazis shut the company down in November 1941. The Nazis allowed the Czech Philharmonic to continue operating; Kubelík, who had first conducted the orchestra when he was 19, became its principal conductor.  In 1943 he married the Czech violinist Ludmilla Bertlová, with whom he had one son.

In 1944, after various incidents, including one in which he declined to greet the Nazi Reichsprotektor Karl Hermann Frank with a Hitler salute, along with his refusal to conduct Wagner during the War, Kubelík "deemed it advisable to disappear from Prague and to spend a few months undercover in the countryside so as not to fall into the clutches of the SS or Gestapo". Kubelík conducted the orchestra's first post-war concert in May 1945. In 1946, he helped found the Prague Spring Festival, and conducted its opening concert.

Defection
After the Communist coup of February 1948, Kubelík left Czechoslovakia, vowing not to return until the country was liberated. "I had lived through one form of bestial tyranny, Nazism," he told an interviewer, "As a matter of principle I was not going to live through another." He defected during a trip to Britain, where he had flown to conduct Mozart's Don Giovanni with the Glyndebourne company at the Edinburgh Festival. He had been engaged on the recommendation of Bruno Walter, whom Kubelík had assisted in this work at the 1937 Salzburg Festival. Kubelík told his wife of his decision to defect as their plane left Czechoslovakia.

In 1953, the Communist government convicted the couple in absentia of "taking illicit leave" abroad. In 1956, the regime invited him back "with promises of freedom to do anything I wanted," said Kubelík, but he refused the invitation. In a 1957 letter to The Times, Kubelík said he would seriously consider returning only when all the country's political prisoners were freed and all émigrés were given as much freedom as he would have possessed. He was invited back by the regime in 1966 but again refused; in 1968, after the Prague Spring had been ended by the Soviet invasion, he organised an international boycott, in which many of the major classical artists of the West participated.

Chicago, Covent Garden and Munich

In 1950, Kubelík became music director of the Chicago Symphony Orchestra, choosing the position over an offer from the BBC to succeed Sir Adrian Boult as chief conductor of the BBC Symphony Orchestra.  He left the post in 1953. Some hold that he was "hounded out of the [Chicago] job" (to quote Time magazine) by the "savage attacks" (to quote the New Grove Dictionary of Music and Musicians) of the Chicago Tribune music critic Claudia Cassidy. But Chicago Sun-Times music critic Robert C. Marsh argued in 1972 that it was the Chicago Symphony trustees who were behind the departure. Their foremost complaint, and that of Cassidy as well, was that Kubelík introduced too many contemporary works (about 70) to the orchestra; there were also objections to his demanding exhaustive rehearsals and engaging several black artists. Many recordings made by Kubelík in Chicago for Mercury Records are available on CD, and have received critical praise. Kubeliki's landmark recording of Pictures at an Exhibition with the CSO on Mercury led New York Times music critic Howard Taubman to observe that listening to it was like "being in the living presence of the orchestra," and Mercury began releasing their classical recordings under the "Living Presence" series name.

After leaving Chicago, Kubelík toured the US with the Concertgebouw Orchestra, and, in the words of Lionel Salter in the Grove Dictionary, "had a brilliant success with Janáček's Kát'a Kabanová at Sadler's Wells in London in 1954". Kubelík became musical director of The Royal Opera, Covent Garden, from 1955 to 1958.  Among his achievements there was, in 1957, the first practically complete production in any opera house of Berlioz's Les Troyens. Although Covent Garden sought to renew his contract, he chose to leave, partly because of a campaign by Sir Thomas Beecham against the engagement of foreign artists at Covent Garden. In 1961 Kubelík accepted the position of music director of the Bavarian Radio Symphony Orchestra (BRSO) in Munich. He remained with the BRSO until 1979, when he retired. Salter considers this 18-year association the high point of Kubelík's career, both artistically and professionally.

In 1961 Ludmilla Kubelík died after a car crash. Also in 1961, he premiered the concerto performance version of Schoenberg's Jakobsleiter-Fragment in Vienna, with the Cologne Radio Symphony Orchestra and choir.

In 1963 Kubelík married the Australian soprano Elsie Morison (1924–2016). In 1967 he became a Swiss citizen, and began an association with the Lucerne Festival, in addition to his work with the BRSO.

In 1971, Göran Gentele, the new general manager of the Metropolitan Opera, New York, asked Kubelík to accept the position of music director. Kubelík accepted partly because of his strong artistic relationship with Gentele. The first production he conducted as the Met's music director was Les Troyens.  The death of Gentele in a road accident in 1972 undermined Kubelík's reasons for working at the opera house. He had prior conducting commitments away from the Met in his first season there, which diverted his attention. He resigned from the Met in 1974, after only six months in the post.

In his post-Czechoslovakian career, Kubelík worked with the Berlin Philharmonic, Boston Symphony, Chicago Symphony, Cleveland, Israel Philharmonic, London Symphony, New York Philharmonic, Vienna Philharmonic and Royal Concertgebouw orchestras, among others. His final concert was with the Czech Philharmonic.

Last years
In 1985, ill-health (notably severe arthritis in his back) caused Kubelík to retire from full-time conducting, but the fall of Communism in his native land led him to accept an invitation to return in 1990 to conduct the Czech Philharmonic at the festival he had founded, the Prague Spring Festival. He recorded Smetana's Má Vlast live with the Czech Philharmonic for Supraphon, his fifth recording of the piece. He also recorded the Mozart "Prague" Symphony and Dvořák's "New World" Symphony at the festival. During the rehearsal of the "New World," he told the Czech Philharmonic, "It is my joy to hear this. I always wanted it to sound like this but never really found it with any other orchestra in the world. That eighth [note] is great!"

On October 18, 1991, Kubelík shared the podium with Sir Georg Solti and Daniel Barenboim and the Chicago Symphony Orchestra in a performance that re-created the orchestra's inaugural October 16 and 17, 1891, concerts. Kubelík led the final work on the program: Antonín Dvořák's Husitská Overture.

Kubelík died in 1996, aged 82, in Kastanienbaum, in the Canton of Lucerne, Switzerland. His ashes are interred next to the grave of his father in Slavín, Vyšehrad cemetery in Prague.

Compositions
Among Kubelík's compositions are five operas, three symphonies, three settings of the requiem, other choral works, many pieces of chamber music, and songs. Salter describes his musical style as "neo-romantic".

Selected recordings
Kubelík recorded a large repertory, in many cases more than once per work. There are two complete recordings of his traversals of three major symphony cycles – those of Brahms, Schumann, and Beethoven. When Kubelík recorded his first complete Beethoven symphony cycle for Deutsche Grammophon, he employed nine different orchestras, one for each symphony. His complete cycle of Mahler's symphonies (recorded from 1967 to 1971 with the Bavarian Radio Symphony Orchestra) is highly regarded. Of his Mahler, Daniel Barenboim remarked, "I often thought I was missing something in Mahler until I listened to Kubelík. There is a lot more to be discovered in these pieces than just a generalized form of extrovert excitement. That is what Kubelík showed." Kubelík also left much-admired recordings of operas by Verdi (his Rigoletto was recorded at La Scala with Dietrich Fischer-Dieskau), Mozart, Janáček, Dvořák and others, including Wagner, whose music he had shunned during the war, but which he conducted in later years. His recordings of Die Meistersinger and Parsifal have been ranked the top choice by many critics, including BBC Radio 3's Building a Library programme.

Kubelík's complete discography is enormous, with music ranging from Malcolm Arnold to Jan Dismas Zelenka, with recordings both in the studio and in concert. In addition to complete cycles of Beethoven, Brahms, Dvořák, and Mahler, Kubelík made recordings of orchestral and operatic works by Bach, Mozart, Haydn, Tchaikovsky, Berlioz, Wagner, Verdi and many others, including modern composers.

In May 2018, Deutsche Grammophon released a 66-disc box-set of his complete recordings for the label.

References

Bibliography

Freeman, John W. "Music First," Opera News, May 2007, pp. 42–45.

External links

 Extensive discography
 František Sláma Archive – contains information on Kubelik under "Conductors – Part 2" in section "Czech Philharmonic Orchestra in Documents and Reminiscences"
 Arnold Schoenberg: Jakobsleiter conducted by Kubelik (YouTube)

1914 births
1996 deaths
20th-century classical composers
20th-century conductors (music)
20th-century Czech male musicians
Burials at Vyšehrad Cemetery
Commanders Crosses of the Order of Merit of the Federal Republic of Germany
Conductors of the Metropolitan Opera
Czech classical composers
Czech conductors (music)
Czech male classical composers
Czech opera composers
Czech people of Hungarian descent
Czechoslovak emigrants to Switzerland
Czechoslovak expatriates in the United Kingdom
Czechoslovak defectors
Honorary Members of the Royal Philharmonic Society
Male conductors (music)
Male opera composers
Music directors (opera)
People from Kolín District
Prague Conservatory alumni
Recipients of the Léonie Sonning Music Prize
Recipients of the Order of Tomáš Garrigue Masaryk
Royal Philharmonic Society Gold Medallists
Swiss classical composers
Swiss conductors (music)
Swiss male classical composers
20th-century Swiss composers
Deutsche Grammophon artists
Mercury Records artists